Robin Baskerville (born 6 April 1950) is a British diver. He competed in the men's 10 metre platform event at the 1968 Summer Olympics.

References

1950 births
Living people
British male divers
Olympic divers of Great Britain
Divers at the 1968 Summer Olympics
Sportspeople from St Albans